The Slaughtermen are an Australian post-punk alternative southern gospel group, formed in Melbourne in 1984.

History
Founder members of The Slaughtermen were Rob Eastcott (piano), Mark Ferrie (bass guitar, vocals), Jans Friedenfelds (aka Johnny Crash, drums; ex-JAB, Models, Sacred Cowboys), Pierre Jaquinot (guitar), Peter Linden (pedal steel) and Ian Stephen (vocals, keyboards). Ferrie and Stephen were later joined by Andrew Pendlebury (ex-The Sports; lead guitar, vocals), Terry Doolan (ex-Sacred Cowboys; rhythm guitar, vocals), and Des Hefner (ex-The Birthday Party; drums, vocals). The band's first single, "God's Not Dead" b/w "Jesus Saves White Trash", was released on the Au Go Go label in 1986. This was followed by 1987's Still Lovin' You LP on the Cleopatra Records label, and 1988's Melbourne, Memphis and the Mansion in the Sky LP on the Agape label. The Slaughtermen gained a following playing revved up versions of southern gospel songs and barroom country classics at inner city rock venues in Sydney and Melbourne between 1985 and 1988.

The band enjoyed a year's residency at the Rising Sun Hotel in Melbourne which built a fairly even following of believers and sceptics. Singer Stephen, only added to the mystique and/or confusion by purchasing a twenty five dollar Reverendship from a religious organization from out of the back pages of the National Enquirer. A nationally broadcast hour-long live concert on Australia's ABC TV, cemented their unique place to this day, as Australia's first and only southern gospel group ( perhaps Steve Messer's Strange Country comes close but their material is fundamentally different), albeit twelve thousand miles from the original source of inspiration, America's Deep South.

"The Slaughtermen were, and still are, one of the most original bands ever to see the light of day in Australia." Mathew W. McPherson, Rolling Stone Australia

Pendlebury and Hefner left the band after the release of Melbourne, Memphis and a Mansion, and were replaced by Tony Thornton, (drums) and Martin Lubran (lead guitar and pedal steel).

After a lacklustre Sydney tour in 1988 the band ceased performing and released Jesus Can't Remember in April 1989 as a 12" EP. Later in 1989, Stephen formed the Ian Stephen Band and released solo material. In 1994 The Slaughtermen reconvened for a series of performances in Melbourne, and released a CD, Gospel Gold, on the Massive label in 1995. This 20 track disc featured live recordings of their gospel material culled from the Live Naturally album and various sound board recordings. In 1997, 2007 and 2009 the original members reformed for one-off concerts in Melbourne.
In May 2012 The Slaughtermen announced performances in Melbourne for the coming August.

The Slaughtermen performed in August 2013 at the Caravan Club, Oakleigh, Victoria. Following the last song of the evening the band announced that  it would no longer perform "Jesus Saves White Trash".
The Slaughtermen performed twice in Sept 2014, in Melbourne, at Tago Mago in Thornbury and The Caravan Club in Oakleigh. The band once again revisited "Jesus Saves White Trash" due to many requests by the audience.

Members
 Rob Eastcott – piano (1984)
 Mark Ferrie – bass, vocals (1984–1987, 1989, 1994–present )
 Jans Freidenfelds – drums (1984)
 Pierre Jaquinot – guitar (1984)
 Peter Linden – pedal steel (1984)
 Ian Stephen – vocals, piano, organ (1984–1989, 1994–present)
 Andrew Pendlebury – guitar, vocals (1985–1987 1994–present )
 Terry Doolan – guitar, vocals (1986–87, 1989, 1994–present)
 Des Hefner – drums (1986–1988, 1994–present)
 Martin Lubran – pedal steel, guitar (1989)
 Tony Thornton – drums (1989)

Discography

Singles
 "God's Not Dead"/"Jesus Saves White Trash" - Au Go Go (ANDA 046) (June 1986)
 "Jesus Can't Remember"/"Jesus Can't Remember" (Instrumental) - Agape (April 1989)

Albums
 Live Naturally - Cleopatra (1986) (Cassette)
 Still Lovin' You - Cleopatra (CLP220) (1987)
 Melbourne, Memphis and a Mansion in the Sky Agape (1988)
 Gospel Gold - Massive (1995)
 Temptation - Endtime (30 May 2007)

References

External links

slaughtermen.net

Victoria (Australia) musical groups
Musical groups established in 1984
Musical groups disestablished in 1988
Musicians from Melbourne